The solo discography of Japanese musician Towa Tei and his side project Sweet Robots Against the Machine includes 11 studio albums, two compilation albums, two soundtracks, three extended plays and nine singles. Towa Tei came to fame in 1990 as a member of the American house group Deee-Lite in 1990, and released his debut solo album Future Listening! in 1994.

Studio albums

Extended plays

Compilation albums

DJ mix compilation albums

Remix albums

Soundtracks

Singles

Promotional singles

Remixes
 Sean Callery - 24 Theme (Towa Tei 24 Hours Remix)
 Björk - Hyperballad (Towa Tei Remix)
 Benjamin Biolay - Les Cerfs Volants (Towa Tei Remix)
 En Vogue - Whatever (Towa Tei Remix)

Notes

References 

Discographies of Japanese artists
Electronic music discographies
Pop music discographies